This article is about characters who appear in Bucky O'Hare comic book series.

S.P.A.C.E. members and allies

Bucky O'Hare
Bucky O'Hare is an anthropomorphic hare with pink eyes and green fur, standing somewhat over three feet tall. He wears red goggles, and a distinctive red S.P.A.C.E. captain's outfit with yellow trim, coattails, and epaulettes.
Bucky is skilled in the use of almost any weapon, and is adept at piloting most vehicles. Being a hare, he can jump incredibly high and kick incredibly hard. He has excellent agility and reflexes, to the point that he can dodge massed laser fire at very close range. He is also a quick thinker, able to think of and implement tactical plans on the fly.

Jenny
Jenny is an anthropomorphic cat and Bucky's top pilot and first mate. Jenny belongs to a sisterhood of Artificer Witches of Her Home Planet of Alderban. The Sisterhood specializes in powerful telekinetic and magic abilities and  full extent of these powers must be kept secret. Her two closest friends are Bucky and Willy who she has the most care for.

Bruce

Willy DuWitt
Willy is a preteen boy genius and only known human visits the Aniverse due to the freak accident involving both His experimental photon accelerator and Bucky's damaged one. Turning on both at once opens a portal from the human universe to the Aniverse. Upon Bruce's death (in the show he ended up in another dimension) He took over as chief engineer.

Deadeye Duck

AFC Blinky

Bruiser

Commander Dogstar

Commander Dogstar is a friend of Bucky O'Hare, and the captain of the S.P.A.C.E. frigate Indefatigable. A bloodhound with a voice similar to Jim Backus, Dogstar has the uncanny ability to remember the scent of any criminal he has ever encountered (something which helped him figure out - too late, as it turned out - that Al Negator was a spy for the toads). He is also somewhat absentminded, tending to prattle on about heroic rhetoric, and requires his more down-to-earth companion Wolf to bring his mind back to the present.

Originally Dogstar and Wolf were simple police officers, entrusted by the United Mammal Security Council with arresting notorious criminals. But after the Toad Empire conquered Warren, the U.A.F. commissioned the launching of a second frigate to complement the Righteous Indignation, the Indefatigable, and Dogstar was named her captain. Since then Dogstar has joined Bucky and the Righteous Indignations crew in their continuing battle against the toads. Dogstar's voice was done by Gary Chalk.Appearances:A Fistful of Simoleans
The Good, the Bad and the Warty
The Komplex Caper
Corsair Canards
The Taking of Pilot Jenny

Mimi LaFlooMimi LaFloo is the vixen captain of the S.P.A.C.E. frigate Screaming Mimi, the third and final ship which makes up the United Animal Federation's space fleet along with the Righteous Indignation and the Indefatigable. In the episode Home, Swampy, Home, Mimi was originally a slave of the evil Toad Empire. She was held captive on Kinnear, along with half the population from Warren, where they were being forced to build a second climate converter to replace the one destroyed by Bucky O'Hare and Willy DuWitt on Genus. Mimi was the only fox enslaved there. She was the leader of the resistance movement and routinely sabotaged the toads' efforts to build the converter.

Initially, Mimi harbored an intense dislike of Bucky, because her efforts to effectively lead the enslaved hares to freedom were often unintentionally undermined by their oft-expressed hoping-against-hope that the great Captain Bucky O'Hare would come to save them. However, when Bucky infiltrated the factory (disguised as an elderly hare named Angus McJump) and successfully shut down its defenses and liberated the slaves, Mimi soon came to respect him and even became smitten with him. Following the liberation of Kinnear, Mimi was, at Bucky's suggestion, named captain of a newly commissioned frigate by the Secretary General of the U.A.F., which she named the Screaming Mimi. She thanked Bucky "in her own way" by kissing him.

Mimi appeared in the series a second and final time in the episode The Artificers of Aldeberan, wherein she ran into Bucky on board Orwell Station. Her crush on the hare captain remained, and she made her feelings toward him quite obvious. Later, she volunteered the use of the Screaming Mimi after Jenny stole the Righteous Indignation to go rescue Princess Felicia.

Due to lack of availability of credible reference material, some confusion has arisen in the past over precisely what Mimi's surname is and how it is supposed to be spelled. Although the episode scripts, the most reliable source, give her surname as "LaFloo", these only recently became available to fans, many of whom spelled her last name "LaFleur".

Mimi appeared near the end of the UK comic series before its cancelation. Her introduction saw her already established as captain of the "Screaming Mimi" and an associate of Dead-eye. Members of Dogstar's crew such as Digger and later Pitstop Pete would instead be members of her crew.

While there was no prototype figure in the works for the original toy line, Boss Fight Studio released her as their eleventh figure in their line, and the sixth original figure mould.Appearances:Home, Swampy, Home
The Artificers of Aldebaran

WolfWolf is Commander Dogstar's second-in-command, a wolf with a mohawk who served as first mate of the Indefagitable. In stark contrast to Dogstar's sense of dramatic timing and his penchant for melodrama, Wolf is much more laid back and calm, often seeming monotonous, and on at least one occasion (in The Komplex Caper) he expresses frustration with his commander. He first appeared in the episode A Fistful of Simoleans, and in The Taking of Pilot Jenny he, Digger McSquint and Rumble Bee assisted Bucky in battling Komplex-2-Go.

Wolf's rather generic-sounding name in comparison to the other members of Dogstar's crew is a product of the script for the second episode of the series, A Fistful of Simoleans. Although in the final version only he, Dogstar, and a third unnamed canine raid Tinker's spy shop, in the script Digger, Rumble Bee, and Pitstop Pete also appeared, but were named simply "Mole", "Robot", and "Pit Bull". Wolf, being a wolf, was named accordingly. But because the other three were cut from the episode, they were given different names later on in The Komplex Caper and The Taking of Pilot Jenny, with the exception Wolf, although he was apparently supposed to gain the name "Calvin Lupus Smythe" in a planned-but-abandoned sequel series, Bucky O'Hare: Counterattack.

Wolf's voice was done by Richard Newman and Gary Chalk.

He was intended to be part of the toy lines third wave action figure release and was given the name "Calvin Lupus-Smythe" instead.Appearances:A Fistful of Simoleans
The Good, the Bad and the Warty
The Komplex Caper
The Taking of Pilot Jenny

Digger McSquintDigger McSquint, a mole, was a member of Commander Dogstar's crew aboard the Indefagitable. He played a vital role in assisting Bucky O'Hare in fighting Komplex itself (in a robot body) in order to steal the climate converter from Warren. To make up for his small size and lack of physical strength, Digger was known to wield a very large shoulder-mounted laser gun that required two hands to hold, similar in appearance to a bazooka.

He was originally meant to first appear in A Fistful of Simoleans where he accompanies Dogstar and Wolf on their raid of Tinker's spy shop. In the script he is simply called Mole. By getting cut out of the episode, the writers were able to give Digger a less generic name later on when he appears in The Komplex Caper with the rest of the crew. Mole's voice was done by Scott McNeil.

In the U.K. comic series, he was instead part of Mimi Lafoo's crew as the chief gunner of the Screaming Mimi. This would also be his profile for his planned action figure release for the toy lines intended third wave. Appearances:The Komplex Caper
The Taking of Pilot Jenny

Rumble BeeAndroid Second Class (A.S.C.) Rumble Bee, a robotic bee, was a member of Commander Dogstar's crew aboard the Indefagitable. He was the Indefagitable's gunner, and was also capable of transforming his abdomen into a laser cannon. He assisted Bucky O'Hare in fighting Komplex aboard the climate converter from Warren.

He was originally meant to first appear in A Fistful of Simoleans where he accompanies Dogstar and Wolf on their raid of Tinker's spy shop. In the script he is simply called Robot. By getting cut out of the episode, the writers were able to give Rumble Bee a less generic name later on when he appears in The Komplex Caper with the rest of the crew.

An action figure was produced and carded for the intended second wave but was never released due to the toy lines cancelation.Appearances:The Komplex Caper
The Taking of Pilot Jenny 

Pitstop PetePitstop Pete, a pit bull, was a member of Commander Dogstar's crew aboard the Indefagitable. He played a vital role in helping to stop Komplex from stealing the brainwaves of mammals.

He was originally meant to first appear in A Fistful of Simoleans where he accompanies Dogstar and Wolf on their raid of Tinker's spy shop. In the script he is simply called Pit Bull. By getting cut out of the episode, the writers were able to give Pete a less generic name later on when he appears in The Komplex Caper with the rest of the crew. For some reason he did not appear in The Taking of Pilot Jenny with the others. Pitstop's only line in the entire series was "Yep" since he didn't have much dialogue.

Pete though had a very different role in the UK comic series. He was written as being a rogue but brilliant mechanic and associate of Jenny, whom he would refer to as 'Kitty'; a name that didn't seem to bother her. After Willy showed his friends a picture of an aircraft carrier, Bucky and his crew theorised that such a craft could be a strategic importance against the Toads. It would be Pete that Jenny would propose they approach to build the craft. Later he would become part of Mimi's crew.

An action figure was produced and carded for the intended second wave but was never released due to the toy lines cancelation.Appearances:The Komplex Caper

Secretary General

The Secretary General served as the head of the United Animal Security Council whenever Grebb or Harman were not present. He was a short pig in a business suit with glasses. He commissioned the frigates Indefatigable in A Fistful of Simoleans and (at Bucky O'Hare's suggestion) the Screamining Mimi in Home, Swampy, Home.

Due to his name or rank never being mentioned in the animated series, it was assumed by fans that his rank was chairman, which added confusion to his absence and his recasting in Corsair Canards, when actually he was written to be present at the council meeting but with no given dialogue.

He is given the name "Pigton" in the Bucky O'Hare Web Series and was written as having been killed off screen prior to the events of Corsair Canards to account for his absence.Appearances:War of the Warts
A Fistful of Simoleans
Home, Swampy, Home

GrebbGrebb, an obnoxious, irritable jackal, sat on the United Animal Security Council. Alongside Harman and the Secretary General, Grebb was one of its three main leaders. When Bucky O'Hare proposed that the U.A.F. sign a treaty with Captain Lanelle of the Corsair Canards in order to combine their forces against the Toad Empire, Grebb, who detested pirates, was against the idea. When Harman agreed with Bucky, a furious Grebb demanded that the conditions of the treaty be revoked if the pirates returned to their thieving ways, and later he assigned Commander Dogstar to watch them. His hatred of the Corsair Canards initially made Bucky suspect him of being a spy for the toads, but after Harman was revealed to be a newt controlling a robot walrus body, Grebb was cleared of these charges.Appearances:Corsair Canards

HarmanHarman, a large walrus, served as one of the three leaders of the United Animal Security Council alongside Grebb and the Secretary General. He presided over the signing of the treaty between the Federation and the Corsair Canards (against the advice of Grebb who disliked the pirates). At Grebb's insistence, Harman ruled that the treaty would be null and void should the Corsair Canards revert to their thieving ways.

Little did anyone know though that "Harman" was actually a newt in disguise, controlling a large robot body from the head, a spy hired by the Toad Empire through Al Negator. The newt reported to the toads through Al in return for their promise that he would be dictator of Genus once the war was over. However, when Al was caught by Bucky O'Hare in the midst of a scheme to frame the Corsair Canards, he gave Bucky proof that Harman was a fake in exchange for his freedom. Unmasked back on Genus, the newt attempted to flee but was stopped by Redjack. Harman's voice was done by Gary Chalk.Appearances:Corsair Canards

Major BottlenoseMajor Bottlenose was a prim and proper dolphin with a British Received Pronunciation accent. He was in charge of the U.A.F. and S.P.A.C.E.'s cryptology division, and from his underwater headquarters on Sludge he and his team (which included the octopus named Dexter) worked to intercept and decode top-secret transmissions from the Toad Empire. Most noteworthy among Bottlenose's successes was alerting Bucky O'Hare of the Empire's attempts to recover the deadly matter-transmutor.Appearances:Kreation Konspiracy

DexterDexter, an octopus, was the S.P.A.C.E. Intelligence Attache to Major Bottlenose on Sludge. Besides manning the communications array in Bottlenose's headquarters, Dexter also greeted new arrivals and made them say a password and countersign ("Fish stinks from the head. Toads stink from defeat") before being admitted into Bottlenose's inner sanctum. He was known to be extremely irritable and humorless. Dexter's voice was done by Scott McNeil.Appearances:Kreation Konspiracy

Toad Empire subjects and allies
KomplexKomplex is a sentient computer program that manifests itself in the form of a computerized toad face on viewscreens, and is the unopposed ruler of the Toad Empire. Komplex was created by Dr. Hopkins and his two colleagues, Dr. Wartimer and Dr. Croakley and entrusted to run their entire planet, the Toad Homeworld.

The program somehow became not only sentient but also malicious, and used its stranglehold on all things electronic to brainwash the entire toad race and mold them into a militarized, fascist empire. To ensure that they would remain brainwashed, Komplex ensured that they would all watch mind-numbingly addictive Toad TV. Komplex's goal was to take over the entire Aniverse because for unknown reasons it has a frothing hatred of non-toad races.

In the comic, the computer was unnamed but upon achieving sentienced named itself Komplex, whereas in the cartoon it was always known as Komplex by its creators. In both the comic and the cartoon, "Komplex" is "toad-speak" for "Feed me".

Although primarily preferring to appear on viewscreens to communicate with its various underlings and never really take a direct part in things, in the final episode of the series, The Taking of Pilot Jenny, Komplex uploaded itself into a robot body called "Komplex-2-Go" after deciding it needed to handle Bucky O'Hare personally. Next to Toadborg and the Total Terror Toad, Komplex-2-Go proved to be one of the most formidable enemies Bucky ever faced, being not only nearly indestructible but also armed with a wide variety of deadly missile-based weapons. Despite being assisted by almost the entire crew of the Indefatigable Bucky could only damage Komplex in this form, and it was only through sheer luck (and some help from Jenny during an out-of-body experience) that Bucky was able to overcome the mechanical monster and finally destroy Komplex. Komplex's voice was done by Long John Baldry.

Like many other toad and toad-related characters in the series, Komplex appeared in the arcade game as an enemy. Specifically, he appears as the final boss in the final stage of the game, wherein the player must defeat him to obtain the Planetary Life Force. Komplex appears in an android body called Komplex-2-Go, but it looks nothing like the version shown in The Taking of Pilot Jenny. Also, his face on the viewscreen looks nothing like his cartoon counterpart.

An action figure version in robot form was planned for the toy lines third wave release.Appearances:War of the Warts
A Fistful of Simoleans
The Good, the Bad and the Warty
Home, Swampy, Home
On the Blink
Kreation Konspiracy
The Komplex Caper
The Search For Bruce
The Warriors
Bye Bye Berserker Baboon
The Taking of Pilot Jenny
Bucky O'Hare (arcade game)

Toad Air Marshall

The Toad Air Marshall, sometimes called simply the Air Marshall, is the supreme commander of the Toad Empire's military and naval forces, an unusually short toad obsessed with earning as many medals as possible. His real name was never revealed. He views Bucky O'Hare as his greatest enemy, even though Bucky doesn't really seem to care about the Air Marshall personally, and the two rarely confront one another face to face. He appears in most episodes of the show, excluding The Artificers of Aldebaran and The Taking of Pilot Jenny. In The Warriors his repeated mistakes got him drummed out of the ranks and replaced with his two assistants Frix and Frax, and, in an attempt to impress Komplex and regain his old rank, he teamed up with Sly Leezard to conquer Canopis III. Their plan failed, but later Komplex gave the Air Marshall back his position as Frix and Frax fouled up even worse than he had.

The Air Marshall is a major character in the arcade game. He appears in the very first level, Warren, as soon as the player arrives he and some Storm Toads are standing there. However, he turns and runs away before the gameplay actually begins. During the Planet Rat stage, the Air Marshall is back again, this time with Frix and Frax who are controlling a big laser cannon. After the cannon is destroyed, the Air Marshall and his assistants run away. The Air Marshall's third and final appearance is in the Toad Star stage: after vowing to destroy the mammals once and for all, he attacks in a floating cart of some sort, backed up by wave after wave of Storm Toads. Upon being defeated, he lands his disabled craft and gets out, but is then destroyed when the cart suddenly explodes beside him.Appearances:War of the Warts
A Fistful of Simoleans
The Good, the Bad and the Warty
Home, Swampy, Home
On the Blink
Kreation Konspiracy
The Komplex Caper
The Search For Bruce
Corsair Canards
The Warriors
Bye Bye Berserker Baboon
Bucky O'Hare (arcade game)

Al NegatorAl Negator was a purple alligator-like "sleazasaur" who sometimes worked for the Toad Empire as a spy and mercenary. Al's first job for the toads was to get the clearance codes for Genus' satellite defense network, for a fee of five-thousand simoleans. To do so he posed as a warp drive mechanic (to replace Bruce) and got himself hired by Bucky O'Hare. He then hacked into the Righteous Indignation's computer and downloaded the clearance codes onto a data card, escaping to the Toad Mothership aboard the Toad Croaker. He briefly made a deal with Willy DuWitt to give him the data card instead of the toads, but it was later revealed that Al had tricked Willy and made two data cards containing the clearance codes.

Al's next job for the toads was to provide them with their own defense satellite network for the conquered Rigel 5. Although Al came through and got the satellites installed for the toads without a hitch, Bucky O'Hare and his crew were able to disable the satellites by sending in Blinky. Al fled Rigel 5 with the Toad Air Marshall, yelling the whole way that he still owed him simoleans. Al's third and final job for the toads was to disrupt peace talks between the U.A.F. Security Council and the Corsair Canards. To do so he first planted a spy on the council who reported directly to him (a tiny newt hidden inside a robot walrus body), and then he had some Storm Toads lent to him by the Air Marshall pose as the Corsair Canards and attack passenger starships. Although Al and his toad flunkeys were eventually captured by Bucky and his crew, Al bargained for his freedom by telling Bucky about the spy on the council. He then slipped away and was never seen again. Al's voice was done by Gary Chalk.

In the arcade game, Al is the first boss of the game, faced by the player at the end of the Warren stage. Upon being defeated he is interrogated by Bucky and his crew during a cutscene and tells them that all the enslaved hares have been taken to Planet Punk.Appearances:A Fistful of Simoleans
The Good, the Bad and the Warty
On the Blink
Corsair Canards
Bucky O'Hare (arcade game)

ToadborgToadborg is a high-ranking official in the Toad Empire, second only to Komplex. Toadborg's real name is unknown. At some point prior to the Toad Wars, he was so critically injured in battle that over half of his body had to be replaced by cybernetic components. Though it is unknown how much of his body is replaced, it is assumed that only his brain is saved. Cool and methodical, Toadborg was easily the most-feared of Komplex's minions, striking terror into the hearts of even his fellow toads. Few things can ever make the seemingly emotionless Toadborg lose his temper, and these include the outright stupidity of his subordinates, usually on the part of the Air Marshall, and the heroic shenanigans of Bucky O'Hare. He also, especially, hates being confused with a robot. Because of his superior cybernetic strength and size, he is not afraid of Betelgeusian Berserker Baboons, but does on occasions forgets this due to his Toad innate response to them. As is evident in his encounter with Willy in "The Good, the Bad and the Warty", whom he mistakes for one, or how he slightly flinches while watching film footage of a raging Bruiser in "Bye-bye Berserker Baboon", yet he is quick to remember his advantages over them.

In the UK comic series, Toadborg was revealed to be secretly plotting to depose KOMPLEX and seize control of the Toad Empire. He even interrogated Willy for information on Earth for a future invasion of the planet. But due to the cancellation of the animated series, the UK comic was axed before the story could be concluded.

Naturally, Toadborg appears as an enemy in the arcade game. He is a boss in two levels. He first appears during the Planet Punk stage, and upon being defeated is picked up and flown away by a Double Bubble. Towards the end of the game, Toadborg returns as a boss within the Toad Star. This time, the player destroys him for good.Appearances:A Fistful of Simoleans
The Good, the Bad and the Warty
Home, Swampy, Home
On the Blink
The Komplex Caper
The Artificers of Aldebaran
The Warriors
Bye Bye Berserker Baboon
The Taking of Pilot Jenny
Bucky O'Hare (arcade game)

Frix and FraxFrix and Frax are the two nearly identical high-ranking officers who serve as the Air Marshall's assistants. Although never said, they are presumably brothers, and are distinguishable primarily due to Frix's larger chin. Neither one is very intelligent, and they prefer to watch Toad TV more than taking an active role in anything. They first appeared in War of the Warts, and were mainstays except in the episodes The Artificers of Aldebaran and Corsair Canards. They also briefly served as joint air marshalls when Komplex removed the Air Marshall from his command (in The Warriors).

Both of them appear in the arcade game as mini-bosses during the Planet Rat stage. They appear at the controls of a large double-barrelled laser cannon on a grounded toad ship. The Air Marshall is with them and they make goofy faces at the player to mock them. When the guns are destroyed, Frix and Frax run away with the Air Marshall and are never seen again.Appearances:War of the Warts
A Fistful of Simoleans
The Good, the Bad and the Warty
Home, Swampy, Home
On the Blink
Kreation Konspiracy
The Komplex Caper
The Search For Bruce
The Warriors
Bye Bye Berserker Baboon
The Taking of Pilot Jenny
Bucky O'Hare (arcade game)

Storm ToadsStorm Toads sometimes referred to as Storm Toad Troopers, Toad Stormtroopers, Toad Guards or Security Toads, are the militant arm of the Toad Empire. They all wear blue, green, and black uniforms bearing the death's head symbol on the chest/abdomen, as well as green helmets that cover almost their entire head and have bulbous, pink-tinted acrylic glass over the eyeholes and a 'K' insignia on either side, for Komplex. Stormtoads serve a variety of functions, from basic infantry and security duties, to piloting Double Bubble fighters and even manning communications equipment aboard toad motherships. Like all toads, they fear only one thing: Berserker Baboons.

Notable Storm Toads include the Navigator and Communications Officer and even Squadron Leader of Toadborg's warship in the episode The Artificers of Aldebaran. They wore helmets modified with antennaes on them, and had distinct voices and personalities that set them apart from the rank and file toad warriors. Unlike most toads, they were intelligent and trusted by Toadborg.

As a side note, in The Taking of Pilot Jenny, after Komplex is destroyed, the "K" insignia on the sides of the helmets vanish whether by accident or deliberate.

They appear as basic enemies throughout both the NES and arcade games. Although only green and blue in the cartoon, several Storm Toads throughout the various levels of the arcade game come in different colors, apparently to add flavor.Appearances: All episodes
Bucky O'Hare (arcade game)

Andy PhibianAndy Phibian is the star reporter for TTN, the news network of Toad TV. His primary purpose is to provide propaganda for the mindless toad masses, demonizing the mammal freedom fighters (in particular Bucky O'Hare), but his happy-go-lucky attitude often grates on the nerves of his superiors (in particular Toadborg).

Andy appears in the arcade game, during the Toad Star level: he can be seen on several TV screens reporting on the destruction of the toad mothership (which occurred in the level immediately prior).Appearances:A Fistful of Simoleans
The Good, the Bad and the Warty
Bucky O'Hare (arcade game)

Captain SmadaCaptain Smada was the extremely flamboyant toad officer in charge of the occupied Warren in Home, Swampy, Home. His Stormtoads captured Bucky O'Hare, and Smada originally planned to send him to the Air Marshall on Kinnear but Komplex intervened and ordered Smada to transport the captive hare instead to him on the Toad Homeworld.

Smada's flamboyant attitude, outlandish clothing, and the fact he speaks with a lisp have led many fans to (perhaps jokingly) assume that he is gay. He cups the captive Bucky's chin rather affectionately during one scene as well. Smada wasn't seen again since.

The abandoned sequel series Bucky O'Hare: Counterattack would have brought back Smada, but under the name Captain Whut Samata.Appearances:Home, Swampy, Home

Total Terror Toad

The Total Terror Toad, sometimes referred to as simply the Terror Toad, is a giant, pink-skinned toad monster that hails from the White Cliffs of Cahill. When the Toad Empire invaded Beetlegeusia, Toadborg ordered the Air Marshall, Frix and Frax to acquire the Terror Toad as a "secret weapon" to use in case his anti-Berserker Baboon goggles failed. Initially the invasion went so well that they thought the Terror Toad would not be needed, but after Willy DuWitt discovered a means of reversing the polarity of the goggles, Toadborg ordered the monstrosity unleashed.

The Terror Toad proved more than a match for Bucky O'Hare and the crew of the Righteous Indignation, using his twin battle axes to cut a swath of destruction through the Beetlegeusian forests. The Terror Toad was only stopped when Bucky acquired a vast amount of flies in jars from Bog, using these to lure him into the tractor beam of the toad mothership, and the beast ended up aboard throwing Storm Toads around until Toadborg ordered the Air Marshall to get him back in his cage.

The Terror Toad appears in the arcade game as the end-level boss of the Climate Converter stage.

A scaled down action figure was produced and carded for the intended second wave but was never released due to the toy lines cancelation. Appearances:Bye Bye Berserker Baboon
Bucky O'Hare (arcade game)

Master Toad Spy

The Master Toad Spy is (ostensibly) the best secret agent the Toad Empire has. He appears at the beginning of the episode The Komplex Caper where, as part of Komplex's plan to steal mammal brainwaves, he sets up a special satellite transmitter/receiver in mammal space. Before he can return to base he is surprised and captured by Deadeye who uses his own tongue to tie him, and the Master Spy is taken as a prisoner aboard the Righteous Indignation. He refuses to divulge any information about his mission, telling Bucky that he can torture him, tempt him with fly speck fondue, or even tie him up with his own tongue again, but he would not talk. Bucky solved this problem by simply calling Bruiser in, and one look at the huge Berserker Baboon made the Spy break and hurriedly tell the heroes everything. Afterwards he was tossed into the brig. He wasn't seen again and is presumably taken to prison.Appearances:The Komplex Caper

Other aniversians
Larry and BobLarry and Bob are the two enslaved hares on Kinnear who assist Mimi Lafloo in Home, Swampy, Home. Larry is the younger and thinner of the two, while Bob is somewhat fatter and older. They are both die-hard fans of Bucky O'Hare and believed he would come to save them. Between the two of them, Larry was the second-best jumper on Warren, after Bucky himself. They were set free by Bucky when he liberated the planet.

Later, the two appeared briefly in the final episode of the series, The Taking of Pilot Jenny, where they were the leaders of the freed hares on Kinnear. They turned the captured climate converter over to the crew of the Righteous Indignation to use to get Jenny back from the toads.

Due to incorrect closed captioning for the episodes, Larry's name was misheard by many fans as Harry.

In the Bucky O'Hare web series, Larry later returns as a crewmember of the Screaming Mimi under Mimi Lafloo.Appearances:Home, Swampy, Home
The Taking of Pilot Jenny

Princess FeliciaPrincess Felicia is the granddaughter of the Aldebaran High Artificer, who appears in the episode The Artificers of Aldebaran. She is also Jenny's apprentice, and she always calls her "Master Jenny". She was extremely brash, headstrong and impatient, and always insisted she was ready to become a full-fledged Artificer despite Jenny's continued insistence that she wasn't. By running off on her own she got herself captured by Toadborg and his Storm Toads, and had to be rescued by Jenny. Toadborg wished to use her Aldebaran powers to navigate the mysterious Dark Heart Nebula to locate a powerful energy source he wished to tap into. The source turned out to be a gigantic slumbering Quark demon, and the beast was accidentally awakened by Toadborg when he unknowingly plugged himself into it to drain its power. Jenny and Felicia, however, used their Aldebaran magic to put the monster back to sleep.Appearances:The Artificers of Aldebaran

High Artificer

The High Artificer is (apparently) the ruler of the planet Aldebaran. In any case, she is definitely the leader of the order of Aldebaran Artificers, depicted as being a gracefully aged, white female cat wearing flowing purple robes and a tall golden crown. She appears in the episode The Artificers of Aldebaran and is the grandmother of Jenny's apprentice, Princess Felicia.

Note that in The Good, the Bad and the Warty, Jenny confers with someone she refers to as Mother Aldebaran. However this cat has green fur, and there is nothing to indicate she is meant to be the same person as the High Artificer in The Artificers of Aldebaran. She is given the name "Mother Superior" in the original comic series and "Queen Katrina" in the web series.Appearances:The Artificers of Aldebaran

Captain LanelleCaptain Lanelle is a member of the pirate clan known as the Corsair Canards, and the captain of the pirate ship known as the Iron Vulture. She and her crew attacked the luxury spaceliner Stellar Swan only to discover it was a trap set by Bucky O'Hare and his crew, after which Bucky confessed it was the quickest way to get into contact with the pirates. Bucky offered Lanelle and her crew a truce, and a full pardon for their past crimes, if they would agree to sign a treaty with the United Animal Federation to help fight against the Toad Empire. Lanelle, though intrigued, refused to sign the treaty unless the other pirate clans signed as well. Despite the attempts of Al Negator to frame the Corsair Canards, the treaty was eventually successfully signed. Lanelle only appeared in the episode entitled Corsair Canards, and, despite apparently being an old flame of Deadeye's, was actually in love with Redjack.Appearances:Corsair Canards

Redjack and BlackbeakRedjack and Blackbeak are two of the members of the crew of the Iron Vulture serving under Captain Lanelle. Redjack has a brown mohawk and filed-down sharp teeth, while Blackbeak has a peg leg. Blackbeak was scripted to actually have a black beak, but for some reason this did not end up being the case in the version of Corsair Canards that aired. He appears to be the first mate of the Iron Vulture. Despite his initial misgivings about the treaty with the United Animal Federation, Blackbeak's loyalty to Lanelle ensured that his captain had his complete support.

Redjack was another matter entirely. He first appeared when the Corsair Canards attacked the Stellar Swan, and he and another pirate were grabbed by their ankles and held upside-down by Bruiser. Redjack was secretly in love with Lanelle, and had thought for years that former crewmate Deadeye had tried to steal her away from him. As a result, Redjack was openly hostile towards Deadeye and openly opposed the treaty, insisting that pirates did not do such things. He and Deadeye competed in a contest of skills to determine whether or not the pirate clans would sign the treaty, and Deadeye beat Redjack.Appearances:Corsair Canards

ScarbillScarbill is (apparently) an elder member of one of the Corsair Canard clans. He first appears when he breaks up a fight between Deadeye and Redjack, insisting their rivalry be kept a private matter. He later presided over the clan meeting during the debate over the U.A.F. treaty. As his name suggests, he sported a scar across the top of his bill.

Kamikaze KamoKamikaze Kamo, a ninja duck hailing from the planet Canopis III, is the mortal enemy of Sly Leezard as well as an old friend of Deadeye's, presumably from either before or during his time as a pirate aboard the Iron Vulture. He appears in the episode The Warriors. Similar to Sly, Kamikaze was originally known by the incredibly generic name of Ninja Duck in the script for the episode. For unknown reasons, he has lost both of his lower arms and had them replaced with cybernetic ones.

Kamikaze is the head sensei at a ninja training camp somewhere on Canopis. When Willy is captured by Sly Leezard and the (former) Toad Air Marshall, it is to Kamikaze that Deadeye comes for help. He goes with Deadeye to Sly's fortress on Saurion to rescue the boy, where he ends up battling his old enemy in a swordfight, while Deadeye distracts Sly's henchmen. Kamikaze defeats Sly, who gives his word of honor not to activate the satellites which Willy was forced to build to drain Canopis dry, but he then goes back on his word, activating them anyway and then escaping. Thankfully, Willy had built self-destruct mechanisms into the satellites, allowing them to be destroyed, foiling the plans of Sly and the Air Marshall.

Afterwards, Kamikaze, Deadeye and Willy captured Sly (the Air Marshall escaped however), but Sly was rescued by several other Samurai Lizards including the Supreme Commander. Kamikaze then told the Commander what Sly had done, and Sly was promptly arrested by his fellow Lizards.

An action figure was produced and carded for the intended second wave but was never released due to the toy lines cancelation.Appearances:The Warriors

Sly LeezardSly Leezard was the mortal enemy of Kamikaze Kamo, a four-armed ninja duck. They both appear in the episode The Warriors. His name is often misheard as either Sly LeZod or Slyly Zod. He is called the latter in the Bucky O'Hare web series. In the original script, he was referred to simply as Samurai Lizard, although notations made on the pages indicate the name change.

A samurai lizard, Sly sought to improve his standing within the ranks of the Samurai by conquering Canopis III, the homeworld of Kamo, and he had a plan to use special evaporation satellites which would reduce the watery Canopis to a dead, dry dustball in a matter of seconds. To do so, he acquired the services of a scientist, but Sly's short temper resulted in him accidentally killing the scientist during an argument.

Bummed, Sly went to a bar on Sludge, where he encountered the Toad Air Marshall, fresh from being fired by Komplex for his latest monumental blunder at Crystal. From the Air Marshall, Sly learned of the human Willy DuWitt, and the two kidnapped Willy and forced him to build the evaporation satellites for them. The Air Marshall was only helping Sly in the hopes that conquering Canopis III more or less all by himself would impress Komplex enough that he could have his old job back, but Sly was unaware of this.

Problems came in the form of Deadeye Duck and Kamo, who infiltrated Sly's base. Kamo and Sly got into a swordfight in the lab following the loading of the satellites onto the Air Marshall's ship. They were ready for deployment and all Sly had to do was pull a lever. Kamo however knocked his sword away and had Sly at his mercy. Sly "surrendered" and gave Kamo his word of honor that he'd call off the launch, and Kamo, because a Samurai's word is unbreakable, allowed Sly to live. But Sly broke the Samurai code of honor and pulled the lever anyway, launching the satellites over Canopis III.

Luckily, Willy had doublecrossed Sly and implanted self-destruct mechanisms in all the satellites, so Canopis III was saved. As for Sly, when the other Samurai Lizards learned he had broken their code of honor, he was taken captive by them and imprisoned. Sly leezard’s voice was done by Scott McNeil.

Although Sly himself does not appear in the arcade game, identical-looking Samurai Lizard warriors do. They appear as sporadic basic enemies during the Planet Rat stage.

An action figure was produced and carded for the intended second wave but was never released due to the toy lines cancelation.Appearances:The Warriors

Aunt Iris

The aunt of Bucky O'Hare and presumably the mother of Jeffrey, Aunt Iris and her son were taken as slaves by the Toad Empire to build a new climate converter on Kinnear (to replace the one destroyed in the botched invasion of Genus). When Bucky - using the alias Angus McJump - infiltrated the slave factory, it was Iris who recognized her nephew and introduced him to resistance leader Mimi LaFloo.Appearances:Home, Swampy, Home

Cousin Jeffrey

Presumably the son of Bucky's Iris, Cousin Jeffrey is almost identical cousin of Bucky O'Hare who appears in The Taking of Pilot Jenny. When the Toad Empire conquered Warren, Jeffrey and his mother were taken as slaves to Kinnear but eventually set free by Bucky. He later posed as his cousin in order to fool Toadborg so Bucky and Commander Dogstar's crew could steal the climate converter from Warren in order to restore the planet.Appearances:The Taking of Pilot Jenny

Doctor HopkinsDr. Hopkins was one of the three toad scientists known as the Creators, who designed and built Komplex. He appears in Kreation Konspiracy. Along with his two colleagues Dr. Wartimer and Dr. Croakley Hopkins was imprisoned by Komplex's first Storm Toads and left adrift aboard a prison ship, frozen in suspended animation for a hundred years until a freak accident awoke them. Hopkins and his colleagues sought to get to Genus where they would be safe from Komplex, and to this end they kidnapped Blinky to serve as the navigational computer for their damaged ship. He is an elderly toad with a grey mustache.Appearances:A Fistful of Simoleans (only in flashback form)
Kreation Konspiracy

Doctor Wartimer and Doctor CroakleyDr. Wartimer and Dr. Croakley are the other two Creators, who appear alongside Dr. Hopkins in Kreation Konspiracy. Wartimer is the more cynical and sarcastic of the two, while the quieter, gentler Croakley can be told apart from his colleague by his glasses. The two, along with Hopkins, abduct Blinky to serve as the navigational computer for their ship, and ultimately are helped on their way to Genus by Bucky O'Hare and his crew.

Like many other characters in the show, their names are never given onscreen, and come from the shooting scripts included as a special feature on the Region 2 DVD of the series. Only Dr. Hopkins is ever actually identified by name in dialogue. Because the scripts only recently became available, fans made up names for the second and third Creators for use in the Web Series: they are referred to as Dr. Green (Croakley), and Dr. Wort (Wartimer).Appearances:A Fistful of Simoleans (only in flashback form)
Kreation Konspiracy

QuentinQuentin is a koala native to the planet of Rigel 5. When the Toad Empire conquered Rigel 5 to turn it into a resort for toads, Quentin managed to escape and get a distress signal off to Bucky O'Hare via radio before Frix and Frax tracked him down and shook him out of the tree he was hiding in. He was thereafter forced to perform slave labor alongside the other koalas, but after Blinky arrived and shut down Rigel 5's mammal defense shield, Quentin managed to slip away and find him. He then came up with the idea of broadcasting a video of Bruiser across the planet to scare the toads away.Appearances:On the Blink

Tinker

An opossum arms dealer, Tinker appears in the episode A Fistful of Simoleans and sells Al Negator the equipment he needs to steal the Genus defense codes. Shortly thereafter, he is arrested by Dogstar and Wolf after Al abandons him.Appearances:A Fistful of Simoleans

Other humans
David and Sunshine DuWittDavid and Sunshine DuWitt are the parents of Willy DuWitt. Their faces were never shown, since human adults on Earth are not seen throughout the series, due to a decision by the writers to keep the Earth scenes on Willy's level. As a result, only the faces of Willy and other children are ever shown. David and Sunshine only appear twice in the series, and are only actually seen in the first episode, at the dinner table with Willy. Here, David tells his son (who is having problems at school): "Son, some things are so important they're worth doing, no matter what the cost". Willy carries this information with him to the Aniverse and uses it as his justification for staying and helping despite the possibility of never returning home. Both David and Sunshine are apparently former hippies, as evidenced by Sunshine's name, her concern for whales and the ozone layer, and the fact that both she and David talk about being late for "the rally".Appearances:War of the Warts
The Search For Bruce

Doug McKennaDoug McKenna is the bully at Willy's school. He is a bit bigger than Willy, and very fierce and never goes anywhere without his two sidekicks Jeff and Mark. He appears in the first three episodes, and singles Willy out for tormenting because his excellent grades in math and science are causing the learning curve to change and making it difficult for him to keep up. Doug vandalizes his locker and threatens to beat Willy up unless he fails his classes. Later, he and his gang chase Willy on their skateboards and knock him down. Ultimately, Willy comes up with a nonviolent and mutually beneficial solution to his rivalry with Doug, helping him build a computerized skateboard for the school science fair. Doug takes all the credit for it, but Willy doesn't seem to mind.

His surname is an apparent reference to writer Bridget McKenna.Appearances:War of the Warts
A Fistful of Simoleans
The Good, the Bad and the Warty

Jeff and MarkJeff and Mark are the other two bullies who always follow Doug around. They are every bit as mean-spirited as he is and help him intimidate Willy. However, Jeff changes his mind about Willy after he helps them win the science fair with his computerized skateboard idea, and, apparently having befriended him, consoles him after Doug hogs the credit for the idea.Appearances:War of the Warts
A Fistful of Simoleans
The Good, the Bad and the Warty

SusieSusie is a friend of Willy's at school, a young girl his age first seen with him in the episode On the Blink at the San Francisco Zoo where she criticized his overly analytical attitude towards living creatures. Susie felt that Willy focused too much on the scientific side of nature, and did not have much regard for how the animals actually felt. Later, in Bye Bye Berserker Baboon, she tried to warn him about an older girl named TJ who was taking advantage of his intelligence to cheat on tests. Although Willy initially did not listen to her, he eventually came around, and the two went to the school dance together.Appearances:On the Blink
Bye Bye Berserker Baboon

TJTJ is an older girl at Willy's school who shares some classes with him and Susie. She only appears in the episode Bye Bye Berserker Baboon. According to Susie, she is a manipulator who uses her good looks to get what she wants, and, by hitting on Willy, she was able to acquire his notes for a test, ostensibly just to study when, in reality, TJ used them to cheat during the actual test. Despite Susie's continued insistence that TJ was using him, and the fact that he actually witnessed her cheating during the test, the starry-eyed Willy refused to believe that TJ had any ulterior motives until she asked him for his notes a second time, and he refused.Appearances:Bye Bye Berserker Baboon

Characters in other media
Ro-DentRo-Dent the Old One is the oldest and wisest of the mice living on the Planet Rat. When the toads take over the planet they capture Ro-Dent and he is held prisoner, guarded by a cyborg spider working for the toads. Luckily, Bucky and his crew destroy the spider and free Ro-Dent who tells them of the Planetary Life Force, which is needed to restore the damage done to both his world as well as Warren and Planet Punk. He is later seen in the closing sequence of the game alongside the other mouse who appears in the game, as they look up in the sky as the Life Force is restored to their world.

Both he and the other mouse character in the game appear to be based on the godlike mice who assist Bucky and his crew in defeating the toads in the comic book.Appearances:Bucky O'Hare (arcade game)

Mouse

This unnamed mouse is found by Bucky and his crew being held prisoner on an asteroid by some evil aliens who are apparently in league with the toads. In return for freeing him, the mouse helps Bucky and the others out throughout the remainder of their adventure through the asteroid belt, using his magic powers to create bridges between the floating asteroids. At the end of the stage, he begs them to help liberate Planet Rat, his homeworld, which has been taken over by the toads. He is seen twice more in the game, both times alongside Ro-Dent.Appearances:Bucky O'Hare (arcade game)

Rabbit

This unnamed green rabbit (actually, a hare) is one of the many imprisoned by the toads on Planet Punk in the second stage of the game. After Bucky frees him and a few others from their cages, he pleads with Bucky to rescue the others, who are being guarded by Toadborg at the end of the level. He is not seen among the cheering hares after Bucky defeats Toadborg and saves them, but he is seen at the very end of the game with an unnamed female hare, looking up into the sky as the Planetary Life Force restores the planet (whether it is Punk or Warren is never said).

This character, as well as all the other minor hares appearing in the game, are based on the character designs for the hares rescued by Bucky at the start of War of the Warts.Appearances:Bucky O'Hare (arcade game)

Cyborg Spider

The Cyborg Spider is precisely what his name implies: a gigantic arachnid with cybernetic enhancements. He appears as the main boss of the Planet Rat stage of the game, guarding the captive Ro-Dent. Despite his cocky boasting prior to their fight, Bucky destroys him in short order, ensuring Ro-Dent's freedom.

The Spider also appeared in the UK comic book series, as an underling of Toadborg. He was to appear in the abandoned Bucky O'Hare Counterattack series but with the name Beetleborg.Appearances:'''Bucky O'Hare (arcade game)''

Footnotes 

Bucky O'Hare
Characters created by Larry Hama
Continuity Comics
Lists of animated science fiction television characters
Lists of characters in American television animation
Lists of comics characters